Sir Alan Roy Fletcher (1907–1991) was a politician in Queensland, Australia. He was a Member of the Queensland Legislative Assembly.

Early life
Alan Roy Fletcher was born on 26 January 1907 at Pittsworth, Queensland, the son of Alexander Roy Fletcher and his wife Rosena Wilhelmine (née McIntyre). He was educated at Pittsworth State School and Scots College in Warwick. He married Enid Edna Phair Thompson on 15 March 1934; the couple had 2 sons and 2 daughters. He was engaged in farming at Mount Tyson, Queensland.

Politics

Alan Fletcher was a member of the Country Party.

He served as a councillor in the Pittsworth Shire Council from 1945 to 1955 and was its chairman for nine years 1949–1957.

He was elected to the Queensland Legislative Assembly in the electoral district of Cunningham at the 1953 election, holding his seat until retirement at the 1974 election.

During his 21 years in state politics, he held a number of important roles:
 Speaker: 27 August 1957 – 15 June 1960 
 Minister for Lands and Irrigation: 16 June 1960 – 17 January 1968 
 Minister for Education and Cultural Activities: 17 January 1968 – 23 December 1974

In 1972, Alan Fletcher was knighted for services to the parliament and the people of Queensland.

Later life
Alan Fletcher died  on 7 October 1991 at Toowoomba. He was cremated and his ashes placed in a columbarium wall at Pittsworth Cemetery.

See also
 Members of the Queensland Legislative Assembly, 1953–1956; 1956–1957; 1957–1960; 1960–1963; 1963–1966; 1966–1969; 1969–1972; 1972–1974

References

Members of the Queensland Legislative Assembly
Politicians awarded knighthoods
1907 births
1991 deaths
Australian Knights Bachelor
20th-century Australian politicians
National Party of Australia members of the Parliament of Queensland